"Eye of the Beholder" is the 39th episode of the sci-fi anthology television series The Twilight Zone. It is a remake of the episode from the original Twilight Zone written by Rod Serling about a woman with bandages covering her face hoping that a last-chance surgery will allow her to fit in with society, lest she be sent to a community of people with her 'deformity'.

Opening narration

Summary
Janet Tyler is lying in a hospital bed with bandages wrapped around her head. It is her eleventh attempt at looking normal in a society that regards her as ugly and since no more procedures are allowed after eleven, she is informed by Dr. Bernardi that she would have to live among others like her should this last treatment prove to be unsuccessful. Janet is anxious to see the result of her latest surgery and the doctor complies with her request to take the bandages off, while requesting the anesthetist to be present in case she gets violent. The bandages are removed during a speech by the Leader of the State and Janet is revealed to be beautiful, while those in her society are revealed to be deformed. Janet flees before the doctor can have her sedated and finds herself surrounded by screens showing the Leader's face as he preaches about conformity. She eventually bumps into Mr. Smith, a handsome man who is to take her to a village with people just like them and tells her that it doesn't matter why they were born the way they are, because "beauty is in the eye of the beholder." The doctor says goodbye to Janet as Mr. Smith leads her out of the hospital to a new life with those of her own kind.

Closing narration

Cast
Molly Sims as Janet Tyler
Reggie Hayes as Doctor Bernardi
Roger Cross as The Leader
Allison Hossack as Janet's Nurse
Chris Kramer as Walter Smith
June B. Wilde as Nurse #2
Michael Karl Richards as Orderly

External links
 Eye of the Beholder on IMDb
 Eye of the Beholder on TV.com

2003 American television episodes
The Twilight Zone (2002 TV series) episodes